Zita (c. 1212 – 27 April 1272; also known as Sitha or Citha) is an Italian saint, the patron saint of maids and domestic servants. She is often appealed to in order to help find lost keys. 

She is often confused with St. Osyth or Ositha, an important English Saint with a town named after her. 

Zita entered domestic service at the age of twelve and served the same family for almost fifty years. Through her diligence and fidelity, she became a trusted and valued servant. She spent her days doing ordinary things extraordinarily well. Zita was known for her kindness and generosity to the poor.

Life 
Zita was born in Tuscany in a village not far from Lucca, to Giovanni and Buonissima Lombardo. Her maternal uncle, Graziano, was a hermit who dwelt on a neighboring mountain where he had built a church and a shelter for travelers. Her elder sister became a Cistercian nun.

At the age of 12, she became a servant in the household of the Fatinellis, a well-to-do family of silk merchants. Signora Fatinelli allowed Zita to attend school for a year and then put her to be trained under an older maid. Seeing how fond everyone was of Zita, the older maid did everything in her power to discredit her as negligent and lazy. Zita never attempted to defend herself. The other servants  interpreted her piety as posturing.

By her meek and humble self-restraint, she at last succeeded in overcoming the malice of her fellow-servants. She gave one-third of her wages to her parents, kept a third, and gave the rest to the poor. The mistress of the house placed Zita in charge of the household almsgiving, and allowed her to visit the sick poor in their own homes and tend to their needs. A small room isolated from the rest of the house was put at Zita's disposal. She would venture out in the evenings and invite some poor homeless woman to supper. The room had a bed, and was offered as safe shelter for the night.

She always rose several hours before the rest of the family and took care to hear Mass every morning before she began work. She attended to her tasks with diligence and fidelity, and studied when possible to anticipate what needed to be done. It was Signora Fatinelli dying wish that Zita be placed in charge of the household. Zita continued to serve the Fatinellis after the death in 1260 of Guglielmo Fatinelli when his son Pagano became the head of the family.

Legends
A story sometimes depicted in art concerns Zita carrying bread in her cloak to bring to the poor. Jealous servants reported this to the master, who confronted Zita. Upon opening the cloak, however, it was found to be full of flowers. A similar tale is told of Elizabeth of Hungary. 

One anecdote relates a story of Zita giving away her own food during a famine, and then that of her master. When he remonstrated with her for depleting the family's own resources, they found the pantry fully stocked. 

There are various versions of the miracle of the loaves. On one morning, Zita left her chore of baking bread either to tend to someone in need, or was deep in prayer in her room. She returned to find in the kneading-trough the loaves all ready set and prepared, or already baked. Since neither the servants nor the mistress knew who had prepared the bread, it was commonly attributed to angels.

On another occasion, Zita was returning from distributing alms when she encountered a beggar. Having nothing left to give him, she accompanied him to the village well to draw him a cool drink. She let a copper jug down into the well, and in the act of holding it out to him, made the sign of the cross over the water, praying that this drink might be blessed to the poor wayfarer. As he made to drink, he found that the water had turned into wine.

Death and canonization 

Zita died peacefully in the Fatinelli house on April 27, 1272. It is said that a star appeared above the attic where she slept at the moment of her death. She was 60 years old, and had served and edified the family for 48 years. By the time of her death, she had become practically venerated by the family.  After 150 miracles had been attributed to Zita's intercession and recognized by the church, she was canonized in 1696.

Her body was exhumed in 1580, discovered to be incorrupt.  Saint Zita's body is currently on display for public veneration in the Basilica di San Frediano in Lucca.

Veneration 
Guilds were established in Zita's honor to provide homes for servants temporarily out of work, to care for those aged or incurably ill, and to provide terms of long service. 

Soon after Zita's death a popular cult grew up around her, centering on the Basilica of San Frediano in Lucca. 

During the late medieval era, her popular cult had grown throughout Europe.  In England she was known under the name Sitha, and was popularly invoked by maidservants and housewives, particularly in event of having lost one's keys, or when crossing rivers or bridges.  Images of Saint Zita may be seen in churches across the south of England.  The church of St Benet Sherehog in London had been to thought to have a chapel dedicated to her, but this is a confusing mistake and the chapel is to St Osyth or Ositha and was locally known as St. Sithes.  Both saints were sometimes referred to as “Citha”. However, despite the gaining popularity, especially amongst women at this time, the cult was not an official one.

Pope Leo X sanctioned a liturgical cult within the church in the early 16th century, which was confirmed upon her canonization.  In 1748, Pope Benedict XIV added her name to the Roman Martyrology.

In 2022, Zita was officially added to the Episcopal Church liturgical calendar with a feast day on 27 April.

Patronage
Zita is the patron saint of domestic workers, housekeepers, waitresses, and household chores. Her feast day in the Roman Catholic Church is April 27. To this day, families bake a loaf of bread in celebration of Saint Zita's feast day.

Legacy
From 1890 to 2000 St. Zita's Home for Friendless Women in Manhattan provided food, clothing, shelter, and job training for destitute women. 

The Church of the Immaculate Conception, in Somerville, New Jersey sponsors the "Saint Zita Ministry" which reaches out to the elderly in the parish who live alone and may need help with washing and changing of sheets, towels as well as personal laundry.

Films
 Zita - Movie about Saint Zita of Lucca, a 2022 film created by the Terra Bona Family, who also served as the actors.

See also 
 Incorruptibility
 Patron saints
 Saint Zita, patron saint archive
 Servant of God Zita of Bourbon-Parma

Footnotes 
  (Online edition hosted by Eternal Word Television Network www.ewtn.com.) This is a straightforward piece of nineteenth-century popular hagiography. It cites its sources thus: “See her life, compiled by a contemporary writer, and published by Papebroke, the Bollandist, on the 27th of April, p. 497, and Benedict XIV De Canoniz. lib. ii. c. 24, p. 245.”
  It states as sources: "The earliest biography of the saint is preserved in an anonymous manuscript belonging to the Fatinelli family which was published at Ferrara in 1688 by Monsignor Fatinelli, ‘Vita beatf[sic] Zitf[sic] virginis Lucensis ex vetustissimo codice manuscripto fideliter transumpta’. For his fuller ‘Vita e miracoli di S. Zita vergine lucchese’ (Lucca, 1752) Bartolomeo Fiorito has used this and other notices, especially those taken from the process drawn up to prove the immemorial cult."

References

Further reading 
 Recipe for St. Zita's Bread from Cook's Blessings, The by Demetria Taylor, Random House, New York, 1965. (Actually a perfectly modern recipe: it makes no claims to resemble loaves made in thirteenth-century Lucca.)
 St. Zita is a short account of Zita’s life published by St. Charles Borromeo Catholic Church, Picayune, MS, USA. It gives no sources.
 Life of St. Zita – Butler Life of St. Zita – Taken from Vol. IV of "The Lives of the Fathers, Martyrs and Other Principal Saints" by the Rev. Alban Butler, the 1864 edition published by D. & J. Sadlier, & Company)
  (Online edition hosted by The Order of the Magnificat of the Mother of God from the Monastery of the Apostles, Mont-Tremblant, Quebec, Canada.) This book for children is a “compilation based on Butler’s Lives of the Saints and other sources.”
 Guerra, Almerico (1875) Istoria della vita di Santa Zita, … narrata secondo i documenti contemporanei. Lucca

External links 

1212 births
1272 deaths
People from the Province of Lucca
Italian Roman Catholic saints
13th-century Christian saints
Incorrupt saints
Female saints of medieval Italy
13th-century Italian women
13th-century Italian people
Medieval Italian saints
Canonizations by Pope Innocent XII
Anglican saints